Kenneth Smith (born March 8, 1965), nicknamed "the Jet", is an American sports commentator and former professional basketball player in the National Basketball Association (NBA). He played in the NBA from 1987 to 1997 as a member of the Sacramento Kings, Atlanta Hawks, Houston Rockets, Detroit Pistons, Orlando Magic, and Denver Nuggets. He won back-to-back NBA championships with Houston.

Smith played college basketball with the North Carolina Tar Heels, earning consensus first-team All-American honors as a senior in 1987. He was selected by Sacramento in the first round of the 1987 NBA draft with the sixth overall pick, and was named to the NBA All-Rookie First Team with the Kings. After retiring from playing, Smith became a basketball commentator for the Emmy Award-winning Inside the NBA on TNT. He also works as an analyst for CBS/Turner during the NCAA Division I men's basketball tournament.

Early life
Smith was born in Brooklyn, a borough of New York City and later grew up in Queens, spending time in the LeFrak City neighborhood. He played some of his earliest basketball at New York's Riverside Church. Smith attended Archbishop Molloy High School, where he was coached by Jack Curran, the high school coach with the most wins in New York City and New York State history. Smith was named a McDonald's All-American in 1983, then played basketball at the University of North Carolina for Dean Smith.

Kenny Smith credits former South Carolina State star Bobby Lewis with his development as a shooter and ballhandler. Lewis averaged 30.9 points per game and was a First Team Division II All-American as a senior at South Carolina State. He later developed the Bobby Lewis Basketball Skills Development Program, a training regimen that he presented at basketball camps around the country. Smith attended several of his lectures while in high school, and continued to use Lewis's drills throughout his basketball career, to this day teaching them at his own basketball camps. Of Lewis, Smith said, "He's the best lecturer ever. He had the best influence in terms of my workout regimen without question."

College career
Kenny Smith joined junior Michael Jordan and senior Sam Perkins on a North Carolina team that was a pre-season #1 and finished the season ranked #1 with a 28–3 record. Smith averaged 9.1 points and 5.0 assists per game, and the Tar Heels lost to Indiana in the regional semifinals of the 1984 NCAA tournament. He led North Carolina to the Elite Eight in 1985, losing to eventual national champion Villanova. Smith was named a Consensus All-American (1st Team) as senior in 1987, averaging 16.9 points, 6.1 assists per game while helping North Carolina to return to the Elite Eight. Playing in a game that featured eleven future NBA players, Smith led the Tar Heels with 25 points and 7 assists in a loss to Syracuse, 79–75.

During his career at North Carolina, Smith averaged 12.9 points and 6.0 assists per game, while shooting .512 from the field, and .823 from the free throw line. In 1986–87, the first season the NCAA added three-point field goals, Smith shot .408. As of 2016, he ranks second in school history in total assists (768), fourth in total steals (195), and fifth in assists per game. Smith helped North Carolina to a record of 115–22 from the 1983–84 to 1986–87 seasons, including two Elite Eight appearances (1985 and 1987) and a Sweet Sixteen appearance in 1986. They won the Atlantic Coast Conference (ACC) regular season conference championships in 1984 and 1987, and tied for first in 1985. North Carolina never finished lower than 8th in the national polls during Smith's four years at the school.

International career
Smith represented the United States in the 1986 FIBA World championship, on a team that included David Robinson, Muggsy Bogues and Steve Kerr. He was second on the team in scoring behind Charles Smith with 14.7 points per game. Smith scored 23 points to lead the US to an 87–85 win and the Gold Medal over a Soviet Union team that featured Arvydas Sabonis.

NBA playing career

Early career
Smith was selected as a 6'3" 170 lb point guard by the Sacramento Kings with the sixth pick of the 1987 NBA draft. He was named to the NBA All-Rookie Team (1st Team) after averaging 13.8 points and 7.1 assists per game for the Kings.  Smith began his NBA career playing for Hall of Famer Bill Russell, who was head coach for Kings until he was fired 58 games into the '87-88 season. Smith was traded to the Atlanta Hawks midway through the 1989–90 season, where he was a reserve player for the first time in his career, averaging 7.7 points per game while only starting five of thirty-games he played for the Hawks as a backup to team captain Doc Rivers.

Houston Rockets
After the 1989–90 season, Smith was traded to the Houston Rockets where he would spend the next six seasons. In 1990–91 Smith averaged 17.7 points per game while leading the Rockets in assists per game (7.1) and free throw percentage (.844). He helped the Rockets to a 52–30 record, the best regular season in franchise history at the time. They were swept by the Los Angeles Lakers in the first round of the playoffs. Smith finished 17th in voting for the NBA Most Valuable Player Award, just ahead of teammate Hakeem Olajuwon.

Head Coach Don Chaney was fired after posting a record of only 26–26 in the 1991–92 season. He was replaced by former Rocket player Rudy Tomjanovich, who went 16–14 to close out the season, missing the playoffs by one game. The Rockets then went 55–27 in 1992–93, losing to the Seattle SuperSonics in the second round of the playoffs in seven games. Smith helped to force a game seven against Seattle by scoring 30 points, shooting 4–6 from three-point range, in a Game 6 victory for Houston. The Rockets won back-to-back championships in 1993–94 and 1994–95 with Smith as the starting point guard. From the 1992–93 to 1994–95 seasons, Smith averaged 11.7 points and 4.5 assists per game, with a three-point percentage of .425. In 57 playoff games during the same period, Smith had nearly identical averages of 11.6 points and 4.3 assists, shooting .456 from three-point range. In the first game of the 1995 Finals against the Orlando Magic, Smith had 23 points, 9 assists and made seven three-pointers, including the game-tying shot which sent the game into overtime. Smith's 7 three pointers in the first game of the 1995 NBA Finals was an NBA record at the time. The Rockets won the game 120–118, and went on to sweep the Magic in four games.

Smith had been gradually losing playing time to Sam Cassell, but he continued to be the Rockets' starting point guard through the 1995–96 season. Although Smith's points, assists, steals and minutes per game declined for the fifth straight season, he was still productive in 1995–96. He averaged 8.5 points and 3.6 assists per game, and shot .382 from three-point range and .821 from the free throw line. The Rockets finished fifth in the NBA Western Conference with a 48–34 record, upsetting the fourth-seeded Los Angeles Lakers in the first round before being swept in the second round by eventual Finals runner-up Seattle SuperSonics. In game four of the series against the Lakers, Smith had 17 points, 6 assists and was 4–4 from three-point range to help the Rockets win the series clincher 102–94. The win against the Lakers also marked the final NBA game for Magic Johnson, who returned to the NBA that season after a five-year absence.

Final year
The Rockets released Smith after the 1995–96 season, and he signed with the Detroit Pistons. He played only nine games with the Pistons before he was waived and signed by the Orlando Magic, who released Smith after only six games. Smith then signed with the Denver Nuggets, where he would finish his career as a player. Smith played sparingly for the playoff-bound Pistons and the Magic, but got the last meaningful playing time of his career with the Nuggets, a team that won only 21 games that season. Smith averaged 7.9 points and 3.1 assists while playing just under twenty minutes per game. Overall, Smith averaged 6.3 points and 2.4 assists per game, the lowest averages of his career, while his three-point percentage of .437 (59/135) was the second highest of his career, and the fourth season in which he shot better than 40 percent on three-pointers.

In his professional career, Smith scored 9,397 points (12.8 avg.), recorded 4,073 assists (5.5 avg) while shooting .480 from the field, .399 from three-point range, and .829 from the free throw line. He finished in the NBA top ten in three-point percentage three times (1992–93, 1993–94, 1994–95), and top ten in free throw percentage twice (1992–93 and 1993–94). In the 1988–89 season Smith was fifth in the league in minutes played, seventh in minutes per game, and tenth in total assists. Smith's career three-point percentage of .399 42nd in NBA history through 2010. Through 2016 Smith held the Denver Nuggets franchise record for career three-point percentage (.425), and ranked among the all-time leaders in several categories for the Sacramento Kings and the Houston Rockets.

NBA career statistics

Regular season

|-
| style="text-align:left;"| 
| style="text-align:left;"| Sacramento
| 61 || 60 || 35.6 || .477 || .308 || .819 || 2.3 || 7.1 || 1.5 || .1 || 13.8
|-
| style="text-align:left;"| 
| style="text-align:left;"| Sacramento
| 81 || 81 || 38.8 || .462 || .359 || .737 || 2.8 || 7.7 || 1.3 || .1 || 17.3
|-
| style="text-align:left;"| 
| style="text-align:left;"| Sacramento
| 46 || 46 || 38.0 || .461 || .373 || .809 || 2.6 || 6.6 || 1.2 || .2 || 15.0
|-
| style="text-align:left;"| 
| style="text-align:left;"| Atlanta
| 33 || 5 || 20.4 || .480 || .167  || .846 || 1.1 || 4.3 || .7 || .0 || 7.7
|-
| style="text-align:left;"| 
| style="text-align:left;"| Houston
| 78 || 78 || 34.6 || .520 || .363 || .844 || 2.1 || 7.1 || 1.4 || .1 || 17.7
|-
| style="text-align:left;"| 
| style="text-align:left;"| Houston
| 81 || 80 || 33.8 || .475 || .394 || .866 || 2.2 || 6.9 || 1.3 || .1 || 14.0
|-
| style="text-align:left;"| 
| style="text-align:left;"| Houston
| 82 || 82 || 29.5 || .520 || .438 || .878 || 2.0 || 5.4 || 1.0 || .1 || 13.0
|-
| style="text-align:left;background:#afe6ba;"| †
| style="text-align:left;"| Houston
| 78 || 78 || 28.3 || .480 || .405 || .871 || 1.8 || 4.2 || .8 || .1 || 11.6
|-
| style="text-align:left;background:#afe6ba;"| †
| style="text-align:left;"| Houston
| 81 || 81 || 25.1 || .484 || .429 || .851 || 1.9 || 4.0 || .9 || .1 || 10.4
|-
| style="text-align:left;"| 
| style="text-align:left;"| Houston
| 68 || 56 || 23.8 || .433 || .382 || .821 || 1.4 || 3.6 || .7 || .0 || 8.5
|-
| style="text-align:left;"| 
| style="text-align:left;"| Detroit
| 9 || 0 || 7.1 || .400 || .500 || 1.000 || .6 || 1.1 || .1 || .0 || 2.6
|-
| style="text-align:left;"| 
| style="text-align:left;"| Orlando
| 6 || 0 || 7.8 || .462 || .600 || 1.000 || .3 || .7 || .0 || .0 || 2.8
|-
| style="text-align:left;"| 
| style="text-align:left;"| Denver
| 33 || 3 || 19.8 || .422 || .425 || .854 || 1.1 || 3.1 || .5 || .0 || 7.9
|-
| style="text-align:center;" colspan="2" | Career
| 737 || 650 || 30.1 || .480 || .399 || .829 || 2.0 || 5.5 || 1.0 || .1 || 12.8

Playoffs

|-
| style="text-align:left;"| 1991
| style="text-align:left;"| Houston
| 3 || 3 || 37.7 || .474 || .500 || .889 || 2.7 || 8.0 || 1.3 || 0.3 || 15.3
|-
| style="text-align:left;"| 1993
| style="text-align:left;"| Houston
| 12 || 12 || 32.6 || .492 || .500 || .778 || 2.0 || 4.2 || 0.8 || 0.1 || 14.8
|-
| style="text-align:left;background:#afe6ba;"| 1994†
| style="text-align:left;"| Houston
| 23 || 23 || 30.3 || .455 || .447 || .808 || 2.3 || 4.1 || 1.0 || 0.2 || 10.8
|-
| style="text-align:left;background:#afe6ba;"| 1995†
| style="text-align:left;"| Houston
| 22 || 22 || 29.6 || .438 || .442 || .900 || 2.2 || 4.5 || 0.6 || 0.1 || 10.8
|-
| style="text-align:left;"| 1996
| style="text-align:left;"| Houston
| 8 || 8 || 23.9 || .434 || .387 || 1.000 || 1.5 || 4.8 || 0.6 || 0.0 || 8.9
|-
| style="text-align:center;" colspan="2" | Career
| 68 || 68 || 30.0 || .457 || .448 || .847 || 2.2 || 4.5 || 0.8 || 0.1 || 11.5

Broadcasting career

Smith joined Turner Sports in early 1998, working as a studio analyst for end of the NBA regular season and the playoffs. Smith works with Ernie Johnson Jr., Charles Barkley, and Shaquille O'Neal on Inside the NBA, a winner of the Sports Emmy Award for Outstanding Studio Show. Smith covered basketball for the 2001 Goodwill Games, and he occasionally appears on NBA TV as an analyst. Smith provided commentary for the MSG Network's broadcasts of New York Knicks games from 2005 to 2008, and works as an analyst for CBS/Turner during the NCAA Division I men's basketball tournament. The New York Times has written that Smith's work in broadcasting has made him a household name, significantly boosting his public celebrity beyond what he had during his playing career.

During the 2010 NBA All-Star Weekend, Smith was a member of the Texas team that won the Shooting Stars Competition.

While on the Scoop B Radio Podcast in 2017, Smith told Brandon Scoop B Robinson that the 1994 Houston Rockets would have beaten Michael Jordan and the Chicago Bulls had they faced each other in the NBA Finals.

On the August 26, 2020 edition of Inside the NBA, Smith left the set as a show of solidarity with the six teams that elected to boycott the day's games in response to the shooting of Jacob Blake.  The live broadcast, originally scheduled to lead into a double-header, was turned into a panel discussion of racial injustice in America after the announcement of the games' postponements.

In October 2022, Smith signed a long-term contract extension with Warner Bros. Discovery Sports to continue as a host on Inside the NBA.

Acting career
Kenny Smith played Leon Rich in the movie Hustle (2022), starring Adam Sandler and Juancho Hernangómez.

Personal life
Smith has been married twice. He has two children from his first marriage; Kayla, an R&B singer and K.J., a basketball player at the University of North Carolina, his father's alma mater.

After divorcing his first wife, Smith met English model Gwendolyn Osborne in 2004 at a charity event. They married on September 8, 2006. They have two children together. Smith is also step-father to Osborne's daughter from a previous marriage. Osborne is a former model on The Price Is Right. Gwendolyn Osborne filed for divorce in 2018.

Notes

References

External links

1965 births
Living people
1986 FIBA World Championship players
21st-century American journalists
African-American sports announcers
African-American basketball players
African-American sports journalists
African-American television personalities
All-American college men's basketball players
American men's basketball players
American sports journalists
Archbishop Molloy High School alumni
Atlanta Hawks players
Basketball players from New York City
College basketball announcers in the United States
Competitors at the 1986 Goodwill Games
Denver Nuggets players
Detroit Pistons players
FIBA World Championship-winning players
Goodwill Games medalists in basketball
Houston Rockets players
McDonald's High School All-Americans
National Basketball Association broadcasters
North Carolina Tar Heels men's basketball players
Orlando Magic players
Parade High School All-Americans (boys' basketball)
Point guards
Sacramento Kings draft picks
Sacramento Kings players
Sportspeople from Queens, New York
United States men's national basketball team players
21st-century African-American people
20th-century African-American sportspeople